Carlo Betocchi (23 January 1899 – 25 May 1986) was an Italian writer.

References
 Short biography

1899 births
1986 deaths
Writers from Turin
20th-century Italian male writers
20th-century Italian poets